Jean Louis Maxime van Heijenoort  (July 23, 1912 – March 29, 1986) was a historian of mathematical logic. He was also a personal secretary to Leon Trotsky from 1932 to 1939, and an American Trotskyist until 1947.

Life
Van Heijenoort was born in Creil in France after his parents immigrated from the Netherlands. His father died when van Heijenoort was 2, creating financial difficulty for his family. He completed normal education and became fluent in French. He remained attached to his French extended family and friends until his death and visited France twice a year after he became a naturalized American citizen in 1958. He was murdered in Mexico City in 1986 by his 4th spouse.

Political views
In 1932, Van Heijenoort was recruited by Yvan Craipeau to join the Trotskyist movement. He joined the Communist League in the same year. After Trotsky was exiled, he hired van Heijenoort as a secretary and bodyguard, primarily because of his fluency in French, Russian, German, and English. Van Heijenoort spent seven years in Trotsky's household, during which he served as a translator, helped Trotsky write several books and carried on an extensive intellectual and political correspondence in several languages.

In 1939, van Heijenoort moved to New York City to be with his second wife, Beatrice "Bunny" Guyer. He was not involved in the circumstances leading to Trotsky's murder in 1940. In New York, he worked for the Socialist Workers Party (US) (SWP) and wrote a number of articles for the American Trotskyist press and other radical outlets. He was elected to the secretariat of the Fourth International in 1940 but resigned when Felix Morrow and Albert Goldman, with whom he had sided, were expelled from the SWP. (Goldman subsequently joined the US Workers Party while Morrow did not join any other party or grouping.) In 1947, Van Heijenoort too was expelled from the SWP. In 1948, he published an article, entitled "A Century's Balance Sheet", in which he criticized that part of Marxism which saw the "proletariat" as the revolutionary class. He continued to hold other parts of Marxism as true.

Van Heijenoort was spared the ordeal of McCarthyism as everything he published in Trotskyist publications appeared under one of over a dozen pen names he used. According to Feferman (1993), Van Heijenoort the logician was quite reserved about his Trotskyist youth, and did not discuss politics. Nevertheless, he contributed to the Trotskyist movement until the last decade of his life, when he wrote his monograph With Trotsky in Exile (1978), and an edition of Trotsky's correspondence (1980). He advised and collaborated with the archivists at the Houghton Library in Harvard University, which holds many of Trotsky's papers from his years in exile.

Academic work
After completing a Ph.D. in mathematics at New York University in 1949 under the supervision of J. J. Stoker, Van Heijenoort began to teach mathematics at New York University, but moved to logic and philosophy of mathematics, largely under the influence of Georg Kreisel. He started teaching philosophy, first part-time at Columbia University, then full-time at Brandeis University from 1965 to 1977. He spent much of his last decade at Stanford University, writing and editing eight books, including parts of the Collected Works of Kurt Gödel.

From Frege to Godel: A Source Book in Mathematical Logic (van Heijenoort 1967) is an anthology of translations on the history of logic and the foundations of mathematics. It begins with the first complete translation of Frege's 1879 Begriffsschrift, followed by 45 short pieces on mathematical logic and axiomatic set theory, originally published between 1889 and 1931. The anthology ends with Gödel's landmark paper on the incompleteness of Peano arithmetic. For more information on the period covered by this anthology, see Grattan-Guinness (2000).

Nearly all the content of From Frege to Godel: A Source Book in Mathematical Logic had only been available in a few North American university libraries (e.g., even the Library of Congress did not acquire a copy of the Begriffsschrift until 1964), and all but four pieces had to be translated from one of six continental European languages. When possible, the authors of the original texts reviewed the translations, and suggested corrections and amendments. Each piece was supplied with editorial footnotes and an introduction (mostly by Van Heijenoort but some by Willard Quine and Burton Dreben); its references were combined into a comprehensive bibliography, and misprints, inconsistencies, and errors were corrected.

From Frege to Godel: A Source Book in Mathematical Logic contributed to advancing the view that modern logic begins with, and builds on, the Begriffsschrift. Grattan-Guinness (2000) argues that this perspective on the history of logic is mistaken, because Frege employed an idiosyncratic notation and was significantly less read than Peano. Ironically, van Heijenoort (1967) is often cited by those who prefer the alternative model theoretic stance on logic and mathematics. Much of the history of that stance, whose leading lights include George Boole, Charles Sanders Peirce, Ernst Schröder, Leopold Löwenheim, Thoralf Skolem, Alfred Tarski, and Jaakko Hintikka, is covered in Brady (2000). From Frege to Godel: A Source Book in Mathematical Logic underrated the algebraic logic of De Morgan, Boole, Peirce, and Schröder, but devoted more pages to Skolem than to anyone other than Frege, and included Löwenheim (1915), the founding paper on model theory.

Personal life
Van Heijenoort had children with two of his four wives. While living with Trotsky in Coyoacán, van Heijenoort's first wife left him after an argument with Trotsky's spouse. In 1986 he visited his estranged fourth wife, Anne-Marie Zamora, in Mexico City where she murdered him before taking her own life.

Van Heijenoort was also one of Frida Kahlo's lovers; in the film Frida, he is played by Felipe Fulop.

Selected works

 
 
 

Books which Van Heijenoort edited alone or with others:

References

Bibliography

External links

Perspectives on the History and Philosophy of Modern Logic: Van Heijenoort Centenary special issue of Logica Universalis for Jean Van Heijenoort Centenary with papers by Feferman, Feferman, Hintikka, Jan Wolenski etc.
The Lubitz TrotskyanaNet provides a biographical sketch and a selective bibliography [more complete than Feferman's] of Jean Van Heijenoort
A Guide to the Jean Van Heijenoort papers, 1946–1988
How the Fourth International Was Conceived by Jean Van Heijenoort, August 1944
Jean van Heijenoort Internet Archive

1912 births
1986 deaths
American Trotskyists
American logicians
American historians of mathematics
French Trotskyists
People murdered in Mexico
American people murdered abroad
French people murdered abroad
Philosophers of mathematics
French people of Dutch descent
French logicians
French expatriates in the United States